This is a list of episodes of Jono and Ben (called Jono and Ben at Ten until it moved to the 7:30pm time slot), the New Zealand comedy show.

The show is presented by Jono Pryor and Ben Boyce, with the third presenter's chair filled by Guy Williams. In 2013, series two saw Williams being credited underneath the hosts instead of as a guest.  In November 2013, the hosts announced that comedian Rose Matafeo would also be joining the team as a co-host.

Series overview

Episodes

Series 1 (2012)

Series 2 (2013)
Although TV3 and its parent company MediaWorks were in receivership at the time, Jono and Ben at Ten returned for a second series.  Guy Williams is now billed directly under the main presenters, Jono Pryor and Ben Boyce.  Frankie O'Halloran and Nathan Bevan return as Man Childs, Little Ben and Little Johnny, with Jamie Christmas appearing more as Little Guy.  Both The Changing Room and Old News segments were retired with The NeXt Actor (a comedic celebrity version of The X-Factor) making its debut.
The second series began airing 31 May 2013.

Red Nose Day Comedy Cure For Kids (2013)
While not entirely a part of the Jono & Ben at Ten show, the special was to raise money for the Cure For Kids cause.  Jono, Ben and Guy, "biked" the length of New Zealand (Invercargill to Cape Reinga) while performing their shows skits and challenges in different cities.  The special was an amalgamation between the Friday night primetime shows on TV3, including 7 Days, Jono and Ben at Ten, Super City and X-Factor.  At the time of airing, both 7 Days and Jono and Ben at Ten were on their mid-series hiatus.

Series 3 (2014)

Series 7 (2018)

Jono vs. Ben/Sux To Be
Each week, Jono and Ben challenge each other to creating the most popular video where the audience votes by liking either or both videos on Facebook.  The losing video's creator ends up being punished by the winning video's creator in the next episode of Jono & Ben at Ten's segment Sux To Be.  Where there is a draw, Guy Williams is the recipient of the punishment instead of either Jono or Ben.

 – indicates the presenter with the winning video.
 – indicates the presenter with the losing video and the one who gets punished in the following episode.
 – indicates a draw so Guy Williams gets the punishment in the following episode.

<small>
In episode 1x08, Jono's wife leaves Ben a spare key to perform the punishment.
In episode 1x10, Jono and Ben state their videos were a draw therefore Guy Williams was punished by having to pose in a life drawing class.
In episode 1x14, while Ben's video won and his punishment for Jono was packaging up his car, their crew felt sorry for Jono and stole the flour cannon. As such, Jono shot Ben with the flour cannon before he could complete the punishment.
In episode 1x16 Jono was helped out by Nitro Circus
In episode 1x17, Ben made out Jono (who has a fear of heights) was bungy jumping, only to later push him off.  Also this episode saw the debut of the flour cannon.
In episode 1x18, Ben's wife, Amanda, lets Jono into the house to do a final scare.
In the series one finale, when Jono was about to perform the final punishment on Ben (who was scared, had ice cold Powerade dumped on him, shot by a flour cannon and punched in the head by a female boxer), Jono slips on the ice and does not complete the prank.  Later, while Ben is pranking Jono's pride and joy, his car, by shrink wrapping it then dropping a barricade on to it which crushes it, Ben reveals he switched Jono's car with a decoy.
As this was the series finale, the Sux To Be punishment was decided by the JABbies, where the top three sketches from both Jono and Ben were voted for on Facebook.  However, the boys decide to punish Guy.  His punishment was that he had to stick his hand (and head for the third box) into three blind boxes while singing with "I'll Say Goodbye (Even Though I'm Blue)" with the Jordan Luck Band reminiscent of Guy singing this song at Sonny Bill Williams's press release.  The boxes contained cockroaches, a rabbit and live eels respectively.

Lists of New Zealand television series episodes